August Vann (23 October 1884 Varbola Parish, Harju County – 6 February 1942 Sverdlovsk, Russia) was an Estonian politician. He was a member of IV Riigikogu.

References

1884 births
1942 deaths
Members of the Riigikogu, 1929–1932
Members of the Estonian National Assembly
Members of the Riigikogu, 1932–1934
Estonian people who died in Soviet detention
People who died in the Gulag
People from Märjamaa Parish